Jomi is a village and jamoat in north-western Tajikistan. It is located in Zafarobod District in Sughd Region. The jamoat has a total population of 7,264 (2020).

References

Populated places in Sughd Region
Jamoats of Tajikistan